The Battle of Dibba took place between 632–634 CE during the Ridda Wars and is associated with the deaths of 10,000 men on the plain inland of the coastal town of Dibba, in what is now the United Arab Emirates (UAE). The graves of the fallen are still to be seen in the area.

Al Azd 
When the Persian Sasanian Empire waned, the Al Azd kings became the major political force in the Oman peninsula. The Prophet Muhammad sent a messenger, Amr ibn Al As, who passed through Buraimi and presented his letter to the Sasanian governor, who rejected the Prophet's message. Al As went on to present his message at Nizwar to the Al Azdi Ruler, Abd Al-Juland and his brother Jayfar, who ruled the interior of the Oman peninsula. The brothers brought together the elders of the Al Azd tribe, who agreed that they should convert to Islam.

In 630 CE, the Al Azd allied with the Julanda and attacked the Sasanian governor Maskan and defeated Maskan's forces at Damsetjerd in Sohar, killing Maskan. Leaving behind all their silver and gold, the overwhelmed Sasanians were expelled from the country. On the Prophet's death in 632, Abd travelled to Medina to swear fealty to the Caliph Abu Bakr, who received him with pleasure.

Uprisings 
A series of apostate uprisings took place across Arabia, the suppression of which became known as the Ridda Wars, with a series of commanders despatched to put down the rebellions. Abu Bakr sent two commanders to Oman, Hudhayfa bin Mihsan Al Ghalfani, a Yemeni Himyarite and Arfajah, an Azdi. These were to support the Julanda kings against any dissident Al Azdis.

The leader of the apostates of Oman was Laqit bin Malik Al-Azdi, known as 'the one with the crown', or Dhu'l Taj. A natural rival to the Julanda kings, he forced them into retreat before the army from Medina completed its arduous journey through the Rub Al Khali to reach the Oman peninsula. Meeting up with the Madinan army, the forces of the Julanda were bolstered by tribes from the region who deserted Laqit.

Battle 
The combined force then marched on Dibba, then described as 'a great market and town'. Laqit found early success in the ensuing battle, placing his men's families behind their lines in order to encourage them to fight harder. However, the Medinan army prevailed following the arrival of reinforcements, the Beni Abdul Kais and Beni Najia tribes who had formed part of the Caliph's army but who had been delayed during the long journey from Medina. Contemporary texts put the death toll at 10,000. The town of Dibba was looted and the captives, one fifth of the treasure and the livestock of the town were sent as tribute to Abu Bakr.

The phrase 'Day of Dibba' is still used, signifying the defeat of paganism by Islam.

References 

History of the United Arab Emirates
630s conflicts
Ridda Wars
Dibba